Informatics, an e-Governance quarterly publication of National Informatics Centre (NIC), is a source of news and information on myriad aspects of e-governance innovations and initiatives in ICT across India. It is published both in print and online by National Informatics Centre, Department of Electronic and Information Technology, Ministry of Communication & Information Technology, Government of India.

The current chief editor is Neeta Verma, deputy director general of NIC.

References

External links
 Official website

1976 establishments in India
Magazines established in 1976
Ministry of Communications and Information Technology (India)
Quarterly magazines published in India
Science and technology magazines published in India
Hindi-language magazines
English-language magazines published in India
Information technology in India
E-government in India
Magazines published in Delhi